Dayr Rafat was a Palestinian Arab village in the Jerusalem Subdistrict. It was located 26 km west of Jerusalem. It was depopulated during the 1948 Arab–Israeli War by the Harel Brigade.

History
In 1883,  the PEF's Survey of Western Palestine  described  Dayr Rafat  as a small hamlet situated on a ridge with a spring to the west.

British Mandate era
In the  1931 census, there were 218 people  living in Dayr Rafat.

In The 1945 statistics  the village had a population of 430 inhabitants; 330 Muslims and 100 Christians. with  a total of  13,242    dunums of land.  Of this, 216 dunams  were for  irrigable land or plantations, 10,563  for cereals,  while 10 dunams were built-up  land.

The village had a mosque named for al-Hajj Hasan and three khirbas.

1948 Arab–Israeli War
Dayr Rafat, along with four other villages, were overtaken by the Israeli Harel Brigade on 17–18 July 1948 in Operation Dani. The villages had been on the front line since April 1948 and most of the inhabitants of these villages had already left the area. Many of those who stayed fled when Israeli forces attacked and the few who remained at each village were expelled.
Over the next three months the Israeli army carried out a program of blowing up and demolishing abandoned villages in the area, this included Dayr Rafat.

In 1992 the village site was described: "The site is covered with large piles of stone rubble and stone terraces; some of the latter are still intact, while others have been destroyed and are now mixed with the rubble of the houses. Cactuses grow on the northwestern edge of the site. There are a few tents belonging to the Negev tribe of al-Sani’ the members of which have rented land from the monastery, which owns the village lands. The monastery, located 2 km west of the site, has a large statue of the Virgin Mary at the top of its facade, and parts of the structure are covered with red tiles. There is a spring on the western edge of the village and a cemetery lies in the south; one large tomb stands out. To the west there is a large olive grove."

References

Bibliography

External links
Welcome To Dayr Rafat
Dayr Rafat, Zochrot
Survey of Western Palestine, Map 17:  IAA, Wikimedia commons 

Arab villages depopulated during the 1948 Arab–Israeli War
District of Jerusalem